Black orchid or Black Orchid may refer to:

Books and comics
 Black Orchid (comics), a DC Comics miniseries created by Neil Gaiman 
 Black Orchid (character), a character from DC Comics
 Black Orchids, a Nero Wolfe double mystery by Rex Stout
 "Black Orchids" (novella), the first story in the above
 Black Orchid (Killer Instinct), a character in the Killer Instinct video game series

Film and television
 Black Orchid  (film), a 1953 film with Ronald Howard
 The Black Orchid  (film), a 1958 film with Sophia Loren and Anthony Quinn
 Black Orchid (Doctor Who), a Doctor Who serial
 Black Orchids (film), a 1917 American silent drama film

Music
 The Black Orchid (nightclub), a Chicago night club from 1949 to 1959
 Black Orchid (band), an Australian gothic metal band
 Black Orchid (album), a 1962 jazz album by the Three Sounds
 Black Orchid, a 1987 Hawaiian album by Peter Moon Band
 "Black Orchid", a song by Stevie Wonder from Stevie Wonder's Journey Through "The Secret Life of Plants"
 "Black Orchid", a jazz tune written by Neal Hefti
 "Black Orchid", a song by Avantasia from The Mystery of Time
 “Black Orchid”, a song by Blue October from The Answers

Plants
 Brasiliorchis schunkeana, formerly known as Maxillaria schunkeana, a species of orchid native to Brazil
 Any member of several species of genus Bulbophyllum, commonly called "Black orchid"
 Calanthe triplicata or Australian Black orchid
 Coelogyne mayeriana, a species of orchid native to Southeast Asia
 Coelogyne pandurata (Black orchid), a species of orchid native to Borneo
 Coelogyne ovalis, a species of orchid native to Indochina
 Coelogyne usitana, a species of orchid native to the Philippines
 Coelogyne xyrekes, a species of orchid native to Southeast Asia
 Cymbidiella falcigera and Cymbidiella humblotii (Black orchid), species of orchid native to Madagascar and Île aux Nattes
 Cymbidium canaliculatum (Queensland black orchid), a species of orchid native to northern and eastern Australia
 Dendrobium johannis var nigrescens, a species of orchid from Australia
 Disa cornuta, a species of orchid from South Africa
 Dracula benedictii, a species of orchid from Colombia
 Dracula minax, a species of orchid from Colombia
 Dracula ubangina, a species of orchid from Ecuador
 Dracula vampira, a species of orchid found on the slopes of Mount Pichincha in Ecuador
 Fredclarkeara (Truly black orchid), a hybrid genus consisting of the genera Catasetum, Clowesia, and Mormodes
 Grammatophyllum wallisii, a species of orchid from the Philippines
 Liparis nervosa (Black orchid), a species of orchid native to Japan and China
 Masdevallia rolfeana (Black orchid), a species of orchid native to Central America
 Maxillaria variabilis, a species of orchid native to Central America
 Monnierara (Black orchid), a hybrid genus consisting of the genera Catasetum, Cycnoches, and Mormodes
 Ophrys insectifera, a species of orchid from Europe
 Paphiopedilum
 Phalaenopsis mannii, a species of orchid native to Nepal and China
 Prosthechea cochleata (Black orchid), the national flower of Belize that is also known as the Clamshell (or Cockleshell) orchid
 Stanhopea tigrina var. nigroviolacea or Stanhopea nigroviolacea, a species of orchid from Mexico
 Stelis immersa (Black orchid),  a species of orchid ranging from Mexico to Venezuela
 Trichoglottis atropurpurea (Black orchid), a species of orchid native to the Philippines

See also
 Bouquet of Black Orchids, a compilation album by The Tear Garden
Black Orchid (fragrance), first perfume released by Tom Ford Beauty